Commandant Lucas was one of six s built for the French Navy during the 1910s.

Design and description

The Bisson class were enlarged versions of the preceding  built to a more standardized design. Designed to displace , they displaced  at normal load. Their crew numbered 80–83 men.

Commandant Lucas was powered by a pair of Breguet steam turbines, each driving one propeller shaft using steam provided by four Indret water-tube boilers.

The primary armament of the Bisson-class ships consisted of two  Modèle 1893 guns in single mounts, one each fore and aft of the superstructure, and four  Modèle 1902 guns distributed amidships. They were also fitted with two twin mounts for  torpedo tubes amidships.

Construction and career
Commandant Lucas was ordered from the Arsenal de Toulon and was launched on 11 July 1914. The ship was completed later that year.

References

Bibliography

 

Bisson-class destroyers
Ships built in France
1914 ships